The International Standard Text Code (ISTC) is a unique identifier for text-based works. The ISO standard was developed by TC 46/SC 9 and published in March 2009 as ISO 21047:2009. The authority responsible for implementing the standard was assigned to The International ISTC Agency.  That Agency ceased operations in 2017. Following a public call for a new organization to support the maintenance and registration of ISTC data in which no other organizations stepped forward, and a subsequent report produced by ISO TC 46/SC 9 on text identification, the ISTC standard was withdrawn from the ISO catalogue of standards in August 2021. 

NOTE: The following information has not been substantially edited but remains as an archive of the standard and its implementation.

Purpose
By including one or more ISTC numbers as an attribute of a bibliographic record (e.g., an ISBN record), the aggregation, collocation, filtering, etc. of publication records can be achieved automatically based on the content of the relevant publications. This solves the problem of identifying the relevant content when it is published under different titles, or where different content is published under the same title. The ISTC also enables many improvements in efficiency, such as enabling retail websites to accurately re-use reviews and subject classifications applied to one publication on every other publication of the same work.

Another application of ISTCs involves using them to identify distinct but related works. E.g., the bibliographic records for a number of derivations, such as translations of the same work, can include the ISTC for that original work and thus be automatically grouped together, even though the records are for publications of distinct works with their own individual titles.

Implementation
A single database was used to hold all ISTC records, regardless of which country they were registered in. Anybody wishing to register a textual work, e.g., an author, agent or publisher, must submit a request to an ISTC registration agency with the necessary metadata needed to distinguish that work from all others. This enables each request for the registration of a textual work to be checked for global uniqueness. If a work has not already been registered (i.e., if the metadata supplied on the registration request is found to be unique), then a new ISTC number is returned by the system; if a work has already been registered (i.e., if the metadata supplied on the registration request matches that of an existing ISTC record), then the existing ISTC number is returned. There is no concept of ownership of an ISTC number; the same number should be used by anyone wherever the same work appears and needs to be identified. There is no restriction concerning which registration agency each registration request must be submitted through. Anybody wishing to check whether or not a particular work has already been registered will be able to do so by accessing a free-to-use search facility available on the International ISTC Agency website. NOTE: The search functionality is no longer functioning on the ISTC website. Please contact ISO for information about accessing the historical data.

Format
ISTC numbers are hexadecimal, so may be formed from numbers 0-9 and letters A-F. They are made up of four parts:
 registry agency element - denotes which agency the work was registered through;
 registration year element - denotes what year the work was registered in;
 work element - 8 digit hexadecimal number, unique within year/agency;
 check digit - calculated using a MOD 16-3 algorithm defined by ISO 7064.

Example: ISTC A02-2009-000004BE-A

User manual
The ISTC User Manual is the official guide to the use of ISTCs; it is available for download free of charge from the International ISTC Agency's website.

External links
 .
 .
 .
 .

ISO standards
Unique identifiers
2009 introductions